The 2022 Swiss Open Gstaad was a men's tennis tournament played on outdoor clay courts. It was the 54th edition of the Swiss Open, and part of the ATP Tour 250 Series of the 2022 ATP Tour. It took place at the Roy Emerson Arena in Gstaad, Switzerland, from 18 through 24 July 2022.

Champions

Singles 

  Casper Ruud def.  Matteo Berrettini, 4–6, 7–6(7–4), 6–2

Doubles 

  Tomislav Brkić /  Francisco Cabral def.  Robin Haase /  Philipp Oswald, 6–4, 6–4

Points and prize money

Point distribution

Prize money 

*per team

Singles main draw entrants

Seeds 

 † Rankings are as of 11 July 2022

Other entrants
The following players received wildcards into the main draw:
  Marc-Andrea Hüsler
  Alexander Ritschard
  Dominic Stricker

The following players received entry from the qualifying draw:
  Yannick Hanfmann 
  Nicolás Jarry 
  Juan Pablo Varillas 
  Elias Ymer

The following player received entry with a protected ranking:
  Dominic Thiem

Withdrawals
  Arthur Rinderknech → replaced by  Bernabé Zapata Miralles

Doubles main draw entrants

Seeds

 † Rankings are as of 11 July 2022

Other entrants
The following pairs received wildcards into the doubles main draw:
  Jacopo Berrettini /  Matteo Berrettini
  Marc-Andrea Hüsler /  Dominic Stricker

The following pairs received entry as alternates:
  Vít Kopřiva /  Pavel Kotov
  Elias Ymer /  Mikael Ymer

Withdrawals
  Jacopo Berrettini /  Matteo Berrettini → replaced by  Vít Kopřiva /  Pavel Kotov
  Benoît Paire /  João Sousa → replaced by  Elias Ymer /  Mikael Ymer

External links

References 

Swiss Open Gstaad
Swiss Open (tennis)
2022 in Swiss tennis
July 2022 sports events in Switzerland